Renato "Geor" Gomes (born January 20, 1981) is a Brazilian beach volleyball player representing Georgia.

Team Geor – Gia
Brazilians Renato "Geor" Gomes and his team mate Jorge "Gia" Terceiro represented Georgia at the 2008 Summer Olympics in Beijing, China.

References

External links 
 
 

1981 births
Living people
Brazilian men's beach volleyball players
Beach volleyball players from Georgia (country)
Beach volleyball players at the 2008 Summer Olympics
Olympic beach volleyball players of Georgia (country)
Sportspeople from Paraíba